The 1983 season was the 46th season in the top Soviet football league for Dynamo Kyiv. Dynamo competed in Vysshaya Liga, and Soviet Cup. Last season 2nd place runner-up, this season Dynamo placed only 7th with 10 league's losses.

In 1983 there was established a farm-team in the Kyiv's suburb of Irpin, Dynamo Irpin and managed by Viktor Kanevskyi.

Players

First squad information

Reserve squad information

Transfers

In

Out

Club management
{|class="wikitable"
|-
!Position
!Staff
|-
|Managers||/ Yuriy Morozov
|-
|Team's chief||/ Mykhailo Koman
|-
|rowspan="2"|Assistant managers||/ Anatoliy Puzach
|-
|/ Mykhailo Fomenko
|-
||Goalkeeping coach|| the post didn't exist.

The outgoing manager, Valeriy Lobanovsky, after accepting his appointment to national team, he recommended as his replacement his friend and coach of Zenit Leningrad Yuriy Morozov.

Pre-season and friendlies
Its pre-season training Dynamo was holding at Georgian Gantiadi located on eastern-northern shores of the Black Sea, where they departed on 6 January and with few breaks stayed there until mid of February. On 15 February Dynamo had to dispatch some nine of its better players for the national team friendly with Dinamo Tbilisi. A planned training tour to Yugoslavia before the European Cup quarterfinal with Hamburg was cancelled.
 List of the 1983 Dynamo Kyiv friendlies

Competitions

Overall

Vysshaya Liga

League table

Results summary

Results by round

Matches

Notes:

Soviet Cup

European Cup

Matches

UEFA Cup

Matches

References

External links
 Dynamo Kyiv 1983 roster. footballfacts.ru
 Морозов удивил, был мягок, добр, многое прощал. Молодым такая свобода нравилась (Летопись Акселя Вартаняна. 1983 год. Часть третья.). www.sport-express.ru

Dynamo Kyiv
FC Dynamo Kyiv seasons